His Majesty's Customs (Gibraltar) are the primary customs and import authority in the British Overseas Territory of Gibraltar. It is a uniformed, enforcement body, controlled by the Ministry of Finance, Government of Gibraltar. The customs officers check commercial goods and ordinary people entering with possessions into the territory.

Duties
The main purpose of HM Customs Gibraltar is to carry out customs duties at the entry points to the territory, search for suspected illegal weapons, drugs or goods, carry out basic good-import checks and requirements. To this end, both fixed posts and patrols are used.

In May 2020, they celebrated their 270 years of existence with a parade at No. 6 Convent Place  and their headquarters.

Collector of Customs
The Collector of Customs is the most senior customs officer and is responsible for the day-to-day leadership of the organisation.

Uniform
Customs officers, up to and including the Collector of Customs, wear a traditional British customs uniform.

The symbol of HM Customs is a portcullis, surrounded by a wreath and surmounted by a crown, representing their authority and the monarch.

For men this includes:

Formal dress:
a white-topped peaked cap with capbadge
white long sleeve shirt
black tie
Naval blue tunic (Reefer jacket) with rank sewn on to both cuffs
dark blue trousers
black formal shoes
white gloves

Day dress:
a white-topped peaked cap with capbadge
white long-sleeve or short sleeve shirt
black tie
black trousers
black boots or shoes
black jacket
high-visibility equipment vest and rank worn on rank slides on the shoulders of shirts, jackets and vests.

Marine dress:
blue baseball cap with Customs logo on front
black trousers with leg-pockets
dark blue polo top with Customs logo on left breast
blue jacket, high-visibility equipment vest and rank worn on rank slides on the shoulders of shirts, jackets and vests
life jacket.

For women this includes; the same as above apart from the fact that the white-topped female bowler cap with capbadge and black capband is worn instead of the males' peaked cap. A skirt may also be worn in lieu of trousers, in formal dress.

All medals and decorations (including medal ribbons whilst not on parade) are to be worn on the left side of the tunic.

Rank structure
The rank structure follows the UK HM Customs rank structure.

Transport
HM Customs have marked road vehicles for customs duties, fitted with blue flashing lights and sirens. The current vehicles are dark blue, with blue and yellow markings and the HM Customs crest as well as appropriate wording.

HM Customs Marine Section
The Customs of Gibraltar operate a Marine Unit, which operates two-high speed RIBs. The Maritime Journal reported that "Performance patrol boat specialist FB Design has recently delivered two high speed RIBs to HM Customs in Gibraltar. 
Capable of speeds of over 50 knots these two RIBs are based on standard production hull designs developed by this Italian builder, but they have been fully customised to meet the requirements of the Customs".

HM Customs does carry out counter-drug operations, sometimes in conjunction with the Royal Gibraltar Police and Spanish Guardia Civil.
HM Customs seizes illegal drugs and carries out deterrence operations.

Social media
HM Customs have a Twitter account.

See also
 Gibraltar Defence Police
 Royal Gibraltar Police
 Border and Coastguard Agency (Gibraltar)
 Law of Gibraltar

References

External links
 Official website

Gibraltar
Law enforcement agencies of Gibraltar
Organizations with royal patronage
Government agencies established in 1830
19th-century establishments in Gibraltar
1830 establishments in Gibraltar